Our House is a British sitcom that aired on ITV from 1960 to 1962. The main writer of the programme, which starred many actors known for their roles in the Carry On films,  was Norman Hudis, who wrote the first six Carry On films from 1958 to 1962. Our House is based on the premise of nine people of differing backgrounds sharing a house together.

Production
Our House was created by Norman Hudis, who was also the main writer. Two other writers contributed to the series, Brad Ashton and Bob Block. It was produced by Ernest Maxin. Episodes were recorded in front of a live audience at Teddington Studios. The theme music was composed by Maxin and performed by Johnny Gregory.

Cast
Hattie Jacques - Georgina Ruddy
Charles Hawtrey - Simon Willow
Frederick Peisley - Herbert Keene
Leigh Madison - Marcia Hatton
Trader Faulkner - Stephen Hatton (series 1)
Joan Sims - Daisy Burke (series 1)
Norman Rossington - Gordon Brent (series 1)
Frank Pettingell - Captain Illiffe (series 1)
Ina De La Haye - Mrs Illiffe (series 1)
Bernard Bresslaw - William Singer (series 2)
Hylda Baker - Henrietta (series 2)
Eugenie Cavanagh - Marina (series 2)

With the death of Trader Falkner in 2021, Eugenie Cavanagh is the last surviving cast member.

Plot
Nine people - two couples and five individuals - find themselves at an estate agents in desperate need of a place to live. With none being able to buy a property alone, they decide to pool their money and buy one large house together. Georgina is a librarian who, forced to remain quiet at work, is loud when at home. Simon is a likeable loner who works in the local council's rates office whilst Daisy goes from one job to another quickly. Gordon is a law student and Herbert a shy, single bank clerk. Captain Illiffe is a retired naval captain and his wife a violinist. Stephen and Marcia Hatton are newly-weds.

Episodes
The first series of Our House aired on ITV in late 1960 on Sundays at 3.25pm. The series consisted of 13 episodes, each 55 minutes long. The second series broadcast for 26 45-minute episodes from 1961 to 1962 on Saturdays at 7.40pm. The first seven episodes of series two aired fortnightly across the entire ITV network. However, the remaining episodes - which aired weekly - were not shown in the London region.

Out of a total of 39 episodes, only three are known to have survived in the archives.  The three surviving episodes are "Simply Simon", "A Thin Time" and "Love to Georgina", all from the first series. The surviving episodes have not been seen on British television since 1962.

Series One

Series Two

DVD releases
The three surviving episodes of Our House were released on DVD on 16 July 2012.

References

External links
 

1960s British sitcoms
1960 British television series debuts
1962 British television series endings
Black-and-white British television shows
ITV sitcoms
English-language television shows
Lost television shows
Television shows produced by ABC Weekend TV
Television shows shot at Teddington Studios